The Boardgamer was a magazine founded by Bruce Monnin after Avalon Hill was bought out by Hasbro and the future of their board games was in doubt.  The magazine was published between 1996 and 2004. The intention was to continue support for Avalon Hill products in the same way The General had, as well as (according to Monnin in issue 46 of Operations Magazine), any games contested at the World Boardgaming Championships.

The Boardgamer never achieved high circulation and boasted only 200 subscribers although it did manage to survive for nine years.  The magazine also lacked color and professional graphics.  Monnin went on to become editor of Operations beginning with the Fall 2004 edition (issue 46).  The stated aim of Multi-Man Publishing was to have Operations be their line of games like The General was Avalon Hill's line of products.

References

Defunct magazines published in the United States
Magazines established in 1996
Magazines disestablished in 2004
Wargaming magazines